Robert McClure Bowen (born February 24, 1981) is an American former professional baseball player. He played in Major League Baseball as a catcher from 2003 to 2008 for the Minnesota Twins, San Diego Padres, Chicago Cubs and the Oakland Athletics.

High school years
Bowen attended Homestead High School in Fort Wayne, Indiana. His senior year, he earned All-State honors and was named the Indiana State Player of the Year by Gatorade and USA Today.

Career

Minnesota Twins 
He combined to play 24 games in the 2003 &  seasons before spending the entire  season in the Twins' farm system.

Detroit Tigers 
During spring training , he was placed on waivers by the Twins, and selected by the Detroit Tigers.

San Diego Padres 
Later the same spring, he was again placed on waivers, and was this time claimed by the San Diego Padres.

Chicago Cubs 
On June 20, the Chicago Cubs acquired Bowen and minor league outfielder Kyler Burke from the Padres in exchange for catcher Michael Barrett.

Oakland Athletics 
Bowen was designated for assignment by Chicago and traded to the Oakland Athletics in exchange for fellow catcher Jason Kendall on July 16 of that year. He was released by the Oakland Athletics on March 17, .

Personal life
As of 2019, Bowen had been working as a K-9 handler for the Dooly County Sheriff's office in Georgia.

References

External links

1981 births
Living people
Major League Baseball catchers
Baseball players from Texas
Minnesota Twins players
San Diego Padres players
Chicago Cubs players
Oakland Athletics players
People from Bedford, Texas
Baseball players from Fort Wayne, Indiana
Rochester Red Wings players
Lake Elsinore Storm players